= Keecherry =

- village
- Country: India
- State: Kerala
- District: Ernakulam

Population (2011)
  - Total: 6,356

Languages
  - Official: Malayalam, English
- Time zone: UTC+5:30 (IST)
- Vehicle registration: KL
- Sex ratio: 97.8% (2744/2805) ♂/♀

Keecherry is a village in Ernakulam district in the Indian state of Kerala.

== Demographics ==
As of 2011 India census, Keecherry had a population of 6356 with 3145 males and 3211 females.
